Alfred Fripp may refer to:

Alfred Downing Fripp (artist) (1822–1895), British artist 
Alfred Downing Fripp (surgeon) (1865–1930), English surgeon
Alfred Ernest Fripp (1866–1938), Canadian lawyer and politician
 Alfie Fripp, Alfred George ("Alfie" or "Bill") Fripp (1913–2013), longest serving and oldest surviving British World War II Prisoner of War